John Scott Leary (December 29, 1881 – July 1, 1958) was an American freestyle swimmer who competed in the 1904 Summer Olympics in St. Louis, Missouri.  He won a silver medal in the 50-yard freestyle and a bronze medal in the 100-yard freestyle.

See also
 List of Olympic medalists in swimming (men)

References

External links
  Scott Leary – Olympic athlete profile at Sports-Reference.com

1881 births
1958 deaths
American male freestyle swimmers
Olympic bronze medalists for the United States in swimming
Olympic silver medalists for the United States in swimming
People from Shasta, California
Swimmers at the 1904 Summer Olympics
Medalists at the 1904 Summer Olympics